Sainte-Foy-l'Argentière is a commune in the Rhône department of France.

Details 

The name means "Holy Faith, the silver-producer"; Sainte-Foy is equivalent to the common Spanish place-name Santa Fé, and the reference is to the silver mines around which the village grew.

The village is clustered around  a kilometre-long main street ("la grande rue"), rising from the busy crossroads at the bottom to the high school (collège). In the main square, linked to the church, there is a central castle belonging to Family de Fenoyl, a riverside football club and stadium sometimes visited by Olympique Lyonnais in the pre-season, and a sports and entertainment centre (salle polyvalente). A popular antiques fair, which draws in crowds of thousands, is held every September, and there are other annual cultural activities.

The village's traditional and renowned main industry is roof tile manufacturing ("tuilerie").

Popular mentions 
The writer Bernard Clavel once lived near the village; it is also mentioned in a San-Antonio novel (author Frédéric Dard), and its tiny train station has been featured in various films.

See also
Communes of the Rhône department

References

Communes of Rhône (department)